Convergent beam electron diffraction (CBED) is a diffraction technique where a convergent or divergent beam (conical electron beam) of electrons is used to study materials.

History
This technique was first introduced in 1939 by Kossel and Möllenstedt, who worked with large (~40 μm) probes  and small convergence angles. The development of the Field Emission Gun (FEG) in the 1970s, the Scanning Transmission Electron Microscopy (STEM), energy filtering devices and so on, made possible smaller probe diameters and larger convergence angles, and all this made CBED more popular. In the seventies, CBED was being used for the determination of the point group and space group symmetries by Goodman and Lehmpfuh, Steeds, Buxton and starting on 1985, by Tanaka et al. by using different techniques of CBED which covered different applications.

Applications
By using CBED, different types of information can be obtained: 
crystal structural parameters such as lattice parameters, sample thickness
strain information
defects such as stacking faults, dislocations, grain boundaries, 3-dimensional deformations, lattice displacements
crystal symmetry information - by looking at the symmetries that appear in the disks, point group and space group determination is performed.

Main parameters
In CBED, the diameter of the electron beam is relatively small, usually 1–100 nm. This small diameter of the beam in real space, opens up a greater angular range in reciprocal space. Consequently, instead of diffraction peaks, diffraction disks are seen. The beam semi-convergence angle, α, is of the order of milliradians, ranging from 0.1˚ - 1˚. For small semi-convergence angle, the disks do not overlap with each-other, whereas for larger semi-convergence angles, the disks overlap. 
When a CBED pattern is formed, there are some variables that need to be controlled: 
 the beam semi-convergence angle α - is controlled by the C2 aperture. The size of the diffraction disks depends on α:

where θB  is the Bragg angle of the specimen, a is the width of the diffraction disks and b is the distance between the 000 disk and the hkl disks (see Figure). 
 the focus of the pattern – in a Transmission Electron Microscope (TEM), the image is focused when the specimen is at eucentric height, so one way to defocus the image is by moving the specimen up or down in the z direction. The distance between the crossover of the incident beam and the z position of the specimen is called defocus distance Δf. In exact focus, no spatial information is present in the CBED discs. At a defocus distance, both the direct space and reciprocal space information will start to be visible in the CBED pattern.

CBED and the related techniques
A CBED pattern can be obtained by many different techniques, such as:
Conventional (C)TEM-CBED. In CTEM-CBED different shape condenser apertures are used to obtain the intensity distribution over the entire Brillouin zone. 
Large Angle (LA)CBED - is performed with a large incident angle, ranging from 1˚ - 10˚. LACBED makes it possible to obtain non-overlapping disks with larger diameter than the one determined by the Bragg angle. With LACBED I one can obtain one selected CBED disk at a time on a detector. In LACBED II, with a slight change in the focusing conditions of the intermediate lens, bright field patterns and dark field patterns can be obtained simultaneously, without overlapping each-other on the fluorescent screen. A disadvantage of LACBED is that it requires a large flat specimen.
4D-STEM - in this technique a beam is raster scanned on a specimen in a 2D array and in each position of the array, a 2D diffraction pattern is obtained, thus generating a 4D data set. After acquisition, by using  different phase techniques such as ptychography, one can recover the transmittion function and the  induced phase-shift. In some application, 4D-STEM is called STEM-CBED.
Beam Rocking (BR)-CBED - with this technique, by rocking the incident beam with a rocking coil placed above the specimen, a virtual convergent beam is produced. Given that the diameter of the beam on the specimen is few micrometers, this method has made CBED possible to materials that are susceptible to strong convergent beams. Furthermore, the large size of the illuminated specimen area and the low density current of the beam make specimen contamination insignificant. 
BR-LACBED - in this technique, additionally to the rocking coil above the specimen, there is a rocking coil placed under the projector lens, which is used to bring the preferred beam to the STEM detector. Every time the incident beam is being rocked, the second coil is simultaneously driven so that the beam always falls on the STEM detector.
Signal processing and BR-CBED - in order to enhance contrast in BR-CBED, a band-pass filter can be used which filters a certain frequency band in the CBED pattern. The combination of these two techniques makes the symmetries appearing in the patterns more clear.
CB-LEED (Low Energy Electron Diffraction) - rocking curves are analyzed at a single energy using a convergent probe. Advantages of this method are: mapping of LEED diffraction spots into CBLEED disks, the diffraction patterns originate from a localized region of the specimen which enables extraction of localized structural information, mapping out of the surfaces, sensitivity enhancement of small atomic displacements etc. 
Ptychography is a technique for recovering the phase of the exit electron wave. The reconstruction is done by applying an iterative phase retrieval algorithm which returns a real-space image with both phase and amplitude information. By using electron ptychography, in 2018, images of MoS2 with atomic resolution of 0.39 Å were reported by Jiang et al. which set the new world record in highest resolution microscope.

Relation to other techniques
In literature, there are used several terms referring to electron diffraction patterns that are acquired with a convergent beam. Such terms are CBED, microdiffraction, nanodiffraction etc.  When the CBED technique is used for the acquisition of conventional diffraction information like lattice structure, interplanar spacing from very small areas, then the term microdiffraction is used. On the other hand, the term nanodiffraction is used when there are used very small probes  (< 1 nm or less in diameter).

Advantages and disadvantages of CBED
Since the diameter of the convergent beam is smaller than the parallel one, most of the obtained information from CBED is generated from very small regions, where other methods cannot reach. For example, in Selected Area Electron Diffraction (SAED), where a parallel beam illumination is used, the smallest area that can be selected is 0.5 µm at 100 kV, whereas in CBED is possible to go to areas smaller than 100 nm. Also, the amount of information that is obtained from a CBED pattern is larger than that from a SAED pattern.
Nonetheless, CBED has also its disadvantages. The focused probe may generate contamination which can cause localized stresses. But this was more of a problem in the past and now with the high vacuum conditions, one should be able to probe a clean region of the specimen from minutes to hours. Another disadvantage is that the convergent beam may heat or damage the chosen region of the specimen. 
Since 1939, CBED has been mainly used to study thicker materials. Recently, work on 2D monolayer crystals and van der Waals structures has been conducted, where deformations at a nanometer resolution have been retrieved, the interlayer distance of a bilayer crystal has been reconstructed and so on by using CBED.

References 

Measurement
Laboratory techniques in condensed matter physics
Crystallography
Diffraction